Luton, Bedfordshire, England is an ethnically and culturally diverse town of 203,201 people. Luton has seen several waves of immigration. In the early part of the 20th century, there was internal migration of Irish and Scottish people to the town. These were followed by Afro-Caribbean and Asian immigrants. More recently immigrants from other European Union countries have made Luton their home. As a result of this Luton has a diverse ethnic mix, with a significant population of Asian descent, mainly Pakistani 29,353 (14.4%) and Bangladeshi 13,606 (6.7%).

Since the 2011 census, Luton has had a white British population less than 50%, one of three towns in the United Kingdom along with Leicester and Slough. Luton has a majority white population, when non-British white people such as the Irish and Eastern Europeans are included. Identity wise, 81% of the population of Luton define themselves as British of any race.

Ethnicity

The following table shows the ethnic group of respondents for estimations for 1971 and in the 1991 to 2021 censuses in Luton. 

Luton is a majority minority town in which no single ethnic group make up the majority of residents, however by broad multi-ethnic groups, White's make up 54.7% of the population, a decline of 25.5% from 1991 when White's made up 4 out of every 5 residents (80.2%). Asian British people have grown in proportional size, having gone from 14% in 1991 to nearly one third of the town's population (30%) in 2011. Black British residents have also increased from nearly 5% to nearly 10% in two decades as well as Mixed residents who have gone from 2.6% in 2001 to 4.1% in 2011.

Notes

Distribution

Ethnicity of school pupils 
Luton's schools are majority-minority, that being no single ethnic group makes up the majority, the single largest group is British Pakistanis at 25.1% of the school pupil population and the largest multi-ethnic group being Asian British people at 47.4% in 2022, which was previous White's at 53.5% in 2004. The native White British population has declined from a near majority in 2004 at 49.5% to 17.2% in 2022. Black British people and Mixed people have also increased however Other ethnicities has declined from a peak of 3.7% in 2016 to 2.2% in 2022.

Languages
The most common main languages spoken in Luton according to the 2011 census are shown in the following table.

Religion

The following table shows the religion of respondents in the 2001, 2011 and 2021 censuses in Luton.

Distribution

See also

 Demography of the United Kingdom
 Demography of England
 Demography of London
 Demography of Birmingham
 Demography of Greater Manchester
 List of English cities by population
 List of English districts by population
 List of English districts and their ethnic composition
 List of English districts by area
 List of English districts by population density

References

Luton
Luton
Luton